That Dog (stylized as that dog.) is the debut studio album by American alternative rock band That Dog. The album was released on November 8, 1993, in the United Kingdom on the 4AD imprint Guernica, and on March 1, 1994, in the United States on DGC Records. Several of the album's tracks had previously been issued on the EP That Dog on Magnatone Products, released earlier in 1993.

"Old Timer" was released as the album's only single, and featured a music video directed by Spike Jonze.

Track listing

Personnel
Credits for That Dog adapted from album liner notes.

That Dog
 Anna Waronker – vocals, guitar
 Petra Haden – vocals, violin
 Rachel Haden – vocals, bass, acoustic guitar
 Tony Maxwell – drums, wah-wah

Additional musicians
 Tanya Haden – cello, backing vocals on "Family Functions"

Production
 That Dog – production, mixing
 Tom Grimley – production, mixing
 Bob Ludwig – mastering (Gateway Mastering)
 Chrisa Sadd – production, mixing

Artwork and design
 That Dog – album artwork
 Melodie McDaniel – photography

References

That Dog albums
1993 debut albums
Geffen Records albums